The Cathedral Church of Our Lady and St Philip Howard is a Roman Catholic cathedral in Arundel, West Sussex, England. Dedicated in 1873 as the Catholic parish church of Arundel, it became a cathedral at the foundation of the Diocese of Arundel and Brighton in 1965. It now serves as the seat of the Bishop of Arundel and Brighton.

History
 
The cathedral's location, construction, design, and dedication owe much to the Howard family, who, as Dukes of Norfolk and Earls of Arundel are the most prominent English Catholic family, and rank first (below the royal family) in the Peerage of England. Since 1102 the seat of the Howards' ancestors has been Arundel Castle.

In 1664, Roman Catholic worship was suppressed in England by the Conventicle Act, and all churches and cathedrals in England were transferred to the Church of England. With the Catholic Emancipation Act of 1829, the foundation of Roman Catholic parishes became lawful once again.

In 1868, Henry Fitzalan-Howard, 15th Duke of Norfolk, commissioned the architect Joseph Hansom to design a new Roman Catholic sanctuary as a suitable counterpart to Arundel Castle. The architectural style of the cathedral is French Gothic, a style that would have been popular between 1300 and 1400—the period in which the Howards rose to national prominence in England. The building is Grade I listed and is regarded as one of the finest examples of Gothic Revival architecture in the French Gothic style in the country.

The church was originally dedicated to Our Lady and St Philip Neri, but in 1971, following the canonisation of Philip Howard, 1st Earl of Arundel, and the reburial of his relics in the cathedral, the dedication was changed to Our Lady and St Philip Howard.

Organist 
In 2002, Elizabeth Stratford was appointed Organist and Master of the Choristers of the cathedral, becoming the first woman to hold the post of Director of Music in an English cathedral. Stratford was educated at St. Joseph's Catholic College, Bradford and then at the University of Huddersfield winning scholarships for voice, composition and organ from the RCO and other trusts. She studied at the University of Leeds with Gordon Stewart (organ), Simon Lindley (choir training) and Philip Wilby (composition). She succeeded Alistair Warwick as the Organist and Director of Music of the cathedral, and she also teaches piano at Brighton College.

Events
The Cathedral was the location of a music video of Libera and also of some of its concerts (2007, 2009, 2010, 2012, 2014 and 2019).

Gallery

See also

 Grade I listed buildings in West Sussex
 List of places of worship in Arun

References

External links

 
 Friends of Arundel Cathedral
 360° panorama of Cathedral interiors

Roman Catholic churches completed in 1873
19th-century Roman Catholic church buildings in the United Kingdom
Arundel and Brighton
Arundel and Brighton
Tourist attractions in West Sussex
Arun District
Roman Catholic Diocese of Arundel and Brighton
Grade I listed churches in West Sussex
Grade I listed Roman Catholic churches in England
Buildings by Joseph Hansom
Cathedral